"Isn't She Lovely" is a song by Stevie Wonder from his 1976 album, Songs in the Key of Life. The lyrics celebrate the birth of his daughter, Aisha Morris. Wonder collaborated on the song with Harlem songwriter and studio owner Burnetta "Bunny" Jones. 

The song opens side 3 of Songs in the Key of Life, and starts with a baby's first cry recorded during an actual childbirth. A recording of Wonder bathing Aisha as an older toddler is brought into the final section of the song, mixed with Wonder's extended chromatic harmonica solo. All of the instruments heard in the song are played by Wonder, except for some keyboard parts played by Greg Phillinganes. During the recording process, bassist Nathan Watts laid down a bass guitar line to serve as a guide track for Wonder, but Wonder eventually replaced this with his own keyboard bass performance.

The more-than-six-minute song was not released as a single, as Wonder was unwilling to shorten the song to fit the 7", 45 rpm format. Even without a single release, the song received so much airplay that it reached number 23 on the Adult Contemporary chart in January 1977. Since then, the song has become a jazz and pop standard, covered by many artists.

Wonder performed the song live for Queen Elizabeth II at her Diamond Jubilee Concert on June 4, 2012, with lyrics modified to refer to the Queen.

Releases
The song was not issued as a commercial single and therefore it did not appear on the major charts in the US and UK.  However, due to radio airplay, it reached number 23 on the Billboard Adult Contemporary chart on January 29, 1977. In June 2012, after Wonder performed the song at the Diamond Jubilee of Elizabeth II, the song finally charted in the UK (#94) due to download sales.

Personnel
 Stevie Wonder – vocals, harmonica, percussion, RMI Electra Piano, Fender Rhodes, bass synth, drums, talking in recording
 Greg Phillinganes – keyboards
 Aisha Morris - bathing

Notable cover versions
 Vocalist David Parton released the song in 1976, which was a UK number 4 hit in early 1977. It spent nine weeks on the chart,  and became the 54th biggest hit of the year. Parton's version gave him one-hit wonder status in the UK.
Jazz guitarist Lee Ritenour included the song on his 1977 instrumental album Captain Fingers.
Pianist/percussionist Victor Feldman recorded a jazz instrumental version for his 1977 album The Artful Dodger. Feldman also played congas on Ritenour's version released the same year.
Clarinetist and bandleader Woody Herman fronted a big band version in 1978 on the album Fatha Herman and his Thundering Herd.
Saxophonist/arranger Bill Holman included the song on his 1987 album The Bill Holman Band.
In 2002, a punk rock version sung by Me First And The Gimme Gimmes was included in their fourth album, Take a Break. 
Jacky Terrasson included the song in his 2002 album Smile.
In November 2012, an acoustic version sung by Jimmy Higham and Jon Walmsley reached number 41 on the UK Singles Chart.

Chart history

Certifications

Notes

References

External links
 

1976 songs
1976 singles
2012 singles
Tamla Records singles
Stevie Wonder songs
Songs written by Stevie Wonder
Songs about parenthood
Song recordings produced by Stevie Wonder